is a Japanese voice actress from Osaka. She is currently affiliated with Just Production. Homoto is best known for her role as Lanzhu Zhong in Love Live! Nijigasaki High School Idol Club.

Personal life 
Homoto was born in Tottori Prefecture and she grew up in Chiba, Guangdong, and Osaka. She is a Hāfu with a Japanese father and a Chinese mother. Her father wanted her to learn Chinese, so they lived in Guangdong from 2004 to 2012. At that time, she used her Chinese name "Yang, Ming" (楊明).
Most of the time, Homoto talks to members of her family with a combination of Chinese and Japanese.

After she graduated from high school, Homoto gave up going to the university and went to Tokyo alone with 100000 JPY to pursue her dream being a voice actress.

Career 
Since she lived China from 2004 to 2012, Homoto can speak Mandarin fluently and knows some Cantonese.

In 2020, Homoto started her YouTube channel and does live streaming on a weekly basis. Usually, the stream includes chatting, letter reading, Chinese teaching and guitar segments.

Homoto is not only the voice actress for the Lanzhu Zhong character in Love Live! Nijigasaki High School Idol Club. She is also a staff member under the sound cooperation unit in Love Live! Superstar!!. She helps translate Chinese and Japanese between Liyuu and the director.

Filmography

Television Anime 
 Dropkick on My Devil! (2018–2020, Sister, Skull)
 Love Live! Superstar!! (2021, Sound cooperation)
 Gunma-chan (2021, Honey Work D)
 Love Live! Nijigasaki High School Idol Club 2nd Season (2022, Lanzhu Zhong)

Web Anime 
 Live Animation Heart X Algorhythm (2018–2019, Linlin, Kiilin)

Video games 
 Love Live! School Idol Festival All Stars (2020–present, Lanzhu Zhong)
 Azur Lane (2022–present, Harbin)

References

External links 
 Official agency profile 
 
 
 
 

1996 births
Living people
Japanese video game actresses
Japanese voice actresses
Japanese people of Chinese descent
Nijigasaki High School Idol Club members